Bill Heath may refer to:

 Bill Heath (baseball) (born 1939), retired American baseball player
 Bill Heath (footballer) (born 1934), English football goalkeeper who played for Bournemouth and Lincoln City
 Bill Heath (politician) (born 1959), Republican member of the Georgia State Senate

See also
 William Heath (disambiguation)